Bienville Parish School Board (BPSB) is a school district headquartered in Arcadia, Louisiana, United States.

The district serves Bienville Parish.

In 2012 the superintendent replaced the principals of five of the district's eight schools after encountering poor test scores. KTBS described the move as "the largest leadership change in forty years" for the school system. The district had 2012 test scores worse than that of 2011, and was one of three parishes in northwest Louisiana to have this scenario. Around 2012 it was 50th of out all of the Louisiana parish school systems.

Schools

Schools include:

PK-12:
 Bienville High School (Bienville)
 Castor High School (Castor)
 Saline High School (Saline)
K-12:
 Gibsland-Coleman Complex (Gibsland)
7-12:
 Arcadia High School (Arcadia)
 Ringgold High School (Ringgold)
PK-6:
 Crawford Elementary School (Arcadia)
 Ringgold Elementary School (Ringgold)

References

External links
 Bienville Parish School Board
 

School districts in Louisiana
Education in Bienville Parish, Louisiana